"Gravity" is a song by American rock band Papa Roach featuring vocals from Maria Brink of In This Moment. It served as the second single from the band's seventh studio album F.E.A.R.. The song was released on April 22, 2015.

Chart performance

Weekly charts

Year-end charts

References

2015 songs
Papa Roach songs
Eleven Seven Label Group singles
Songs written by Tobin Esperance
Songs written by Jacoby Shaddix